Adam Davidson may refer to:
Adam Davidson (director) (born 1964), American actor and television director
Adam Davidson (journalist), American radio journalist
Adam Davidson (tennis), former American tennis player
Adam Davidson (footballer), Scottish footballer